Henriette Adelaide of Savoy (Enrichetta Adelaide Maria; 6 November 1636 – 13 June 1676), was Electress of Bavaria by marriage to Ferdinand Maria, Elector of Bavaria. She had much political influence in her adopted country and with her husband did much to improve the welfare of the Electorate of Bavaria.

Princess of Savoy
Born at the Castello del Valentino in Turin, she was the older of twin girls; her sister Princess Catherine Beatrice of Savoy died in Turin 26 August 1637. On 7 October 1637 she lost her father Victor Amadeus I, Duke of Savoy, when she was just one year old. Her mother, Christine of France, was the daughter of Henry IV of France and Marie de' Medici. After the death of her father, her mother served as Regent of Savoy on behalf of two of Henriette Adelaide's brothers: Francis Hyacinth (1632–1638), then Charles Emmanuel II (1634–1675) after the older brother died. Her uncles Prince Maurice of Savoy and Thomas Francis, Prince of Carignano, intrigued against their sister-in-law and her French entourage.

When the first heir Francis Hyacinth died in 1638, the brothers Maurice and Thomas started the Piedmontese Civil War with Spanish support. The two parties in the war were known as the "principisti" (supporters of the princes) and "madamisti" (supporters of "Madama Reale," the Regent Christine ). With the support of her brother, King Louis XIII of France, Marie Christine was able to defeat the challenge to her rule.

Electress of Bavaria
On 8 December 1650 Henriette married Ferdinand Maria, heir to the Electorate of Bavaria future. The next year he became Elector upon the death of his father Maximilian.

Henriette Adelaide had a strong influence on Bavarian foreign affairs in favor of France, whose royal family counted her mother as a member. This led to an alliance between France and Bavaria against Austria. One of the results of the alliance was the marriage of Henriette's eldest daughter Maria Anna and her cousin Louis, Dauphin of France (le Grand Dauphin), in 1680.

She had a leading role in the building of Nymphenburg Palace and the Theatine Church in Munich. Many Italian artists were invited to Munich, and she also introduced Italian opera to the court of Bavaria.

Henriette died in Munich and was buried in the Theatine Church - the church she and her husband built as a gesture of thanks for the birth of the long-awaited heir to the Bavarian crown, Prince Maximilan II Emanuel, in 1662.

Issue
 Maria Anna Victoria of Bavaria (28 November 1660 – 20 April 1690) married Louis, Dauphin of France, and had issue; the present King of Spain descends from her.
 Maximilian II Emanuel, Elector of Bavaria (11 July 1662 – 26 February 1726); married Maria Antonia of Austria and had issue; married Theresa Kunegunda Sobieska and had issue.
 Luise Margarete Antonie of Bavaria (18 September 1663 – 10 November 1665).
 Ludwig Amadeus Victor of Bavaria (6 April 1665 – 11 December 1665).
 Stillborn son (4 August 1666).
 Kajetan Maria Franz of Bavaria (2 May 1670 – 7 December 1670).
 Joseph Clemens of Bavaria (5 December 1671 – 12 November 1723) Elector and Archbishop of Cologne.
 Violante Beatrix of Bavaria (23 January 1673 – 30 May 1731) married Ferdinando de' Medici, Grand Prince of Tuscany.

In addition, the Electress suffered three miscarriages: in June 1661, March 1664 and 1674.

Ancestors

Notes

References
 Preuß: Henriette Adelheid, Kurfürstin von Baiern [In:] Allgemeine Deutsche Biographie (ADB). vol. 50, Duncker & Humblot, Leipzig 1905, pp. 198–200.
 Roswitha von Bary: Henriette Adelaide. Kurfürstin von Bayern. Pustet, Regensburg 2004, .
 Cornelia Kemp: Das Herzkabinett der Kurfürstin Henriette Adelaide in der Münchner Residenz. Eine preziöse Liebeskonzeption und ihre Ikonographie [In:] Münchner Jahrbuch der bildenden Kunst 33, 1982, pp. 131–154.
 Reinhold Baumstark: Abbild und Überhöhung in der höfischen Malerei unter Henriette Adelaide und dem jungen Max Emanuel [In:] Hubert Glaser: Kurfürst Max Emanuel. Bayern und Europa um 1700. vol. I: Zur Geschichte und Kunstgeschichte der Max-Emanuel-Zeit. Hirmer, Munich 1976, pp. 171–205.

External links

|-

1636 births
1676 deaths
Nobility from Turin
17th-century Italian nobility
House of Wittelsbach
Italian twins
Duchesses of Bavaria
Electoral Princesses of Bavaria
Electresses of Bavaria
Princesses of Savoy
Burials at the Theatine Church, Munich
Daughters of monarchs